Good Intent is an unincorporated community located in Deptford Township in Gloucester County, New Jersey.

The community is located along a tributary of Big Timber Creek.

History
An early settler, George Ward, purchased  of land at Good Intent in 1701 and erected small mills.

A cloth mill was erected in 1829. The three-story building was destroyed by fire in 1840, but was soon rebuilt.  About eight years later it burned down again, and was again rebuilt. A mail stage coach began service in 1834 "to leave Good Intent every morning, Sundays excepted".

In 1836, a factory was established at Good Intent which manufactured handles for pitch forks and shovels.  The raw lumber was brought in on scows, and the finished product was transported to Philadelphia.

The Good Intent Church was noted to exist during the 1840s.

An improved road to Good Intent was built from Williamstown (then called "Squankum") in 1853.

References

Deptford Township, New Jersey
Unincorporated communities in Gloucester County, New Jersey
Unincorporated communities in New Jersey